Think Like a Dog is a 2020 American family sci-fi comedy film written and directed by Gil Junger. It stars Josh Duhamel and Megan Fox. The film was released through Premium VOD on June 9, 2020.

Plot
A 12-year-old tech prodigy's science experiment goes awry, and he forges a telepathic connection with his dog. The duo joins forces and uses their unique perspectives on life to comically overcome complications of family and school.

Cast
Josh Duhamel as Lukas Reed
Megan Fox as Ellen Reed
Gabriel Bateman as Oliver Reed
Kunal Nayyar as Mr. Mills
Todd Stashwick as the voice of Henry
Janet Montgomery as Bridget
Julia Jones as Agent Munoz
Bryan Callen as Agent Callen
Hou Minghao as Xiao
Izaac Wang as Li

Production
It was announced in September 2016 that Gil Junger would be writing and directing the film, with Andrew Lazar producing.

No further announcements on the film were made until March 2018, with the castings of Megan Fox and Josh Duhamel. Filming began in New Orleans in May, with Gabriel Bateman, Janet Montgomery, Julia Jones, Kunal Nayyar and Bryan Callen added to the cast.

Release
Think Like a Dog was released through Premium VOD by Lionsgate on June 9, 2020.

Reception

References

External links
 

2020 films
American comedy films
Films about dogs
Films about families
Films about telepathy
Films directed by Gil Junger
Films set in Beijing
Films set in China
Films set in the United States
Films shot in New Orleans
Lionsgate films
Films not released in theaters due to the COVID-19 pandemic
Films scored by Jake Monaco
2020s English-language films
2020s American films